Best of the Sugar Hill Years is a compilation album by dobro player Jerry Douglas, released in 2007 (see 2007 in music). It contains music recorded while Douglas was on the Sugar Hill label.

Track listing
 "The Wild Rumpus" (Jerry Douglas) – 4:03
 "Takarasaka" (Douglas) – 3:51
 "Senia's Lament" (Douglas) – 5:27
 "We Hide and Seek" (Douglas) – 6:32
 "Lullaby of the Leaves" (Bernice Petkere, Joe Young) – 4:02
 "A New Day Medley" (Douglas) – 5:49
 "Cave Bop" (Douglas) – 3:21
 "Hey Joe" (Billy Roberts) – 3:10
 "Birdland" (Joe Zawinul) – 5:25
 "Monkey Let the Hogs Out" (Douglas) – 1:04
 "Ride the Wild Turkey" (Darol Anger) – 3:12
 "A Tribute to Peader O'Donnell" (Dónal Lunny) – 3:13
 "Things in Life" (Don Stover) – 3:05
 "Like It Is" (Erroll Garner) – 3:42
 "In the Sweet By and By" (Traditional) – 2:02

Personnel
Jerry Douglas – dobro, lap steel guitar
Larry Atamanuik – drums, conga, percussion
Russ Barenberg – guitar
Sam Bush – mandolin
Jeff Coffin – saxophone
Stuart Duncan – fiddle
Béla Fleck – banjo
John Gardner – drums
Viktor Krauss – bass
Edgar Meyer – bass
Scott Nygaard – guitar
Tim O'Brien – mandolin, vocals
Peter Rowan – guitar, vocals
Mark Schatz – bass
Craig Robert Smith – banjo
Adam Steffey – mandolin
 Bryan Sutton – guitar

Jerry Douglas albums
2007 greatest hits albums
Sugar Hill Records compilation albums